Easton is a city in, and the county seat of, Northampton County, Pennsylvania, United States. The city's population was 28,127 as of the 2020 census. Easton is located at the confluence of the Lehigh River, a  river that joins the Delaware River in Easton and serves as the city's eastern geographic boundary with Phillipsburg, New Jersey.

Easton is the easternmost city in the Lehigh Valley, a region of  that is Pennsylvania's third largest metropolitan region with 861,889 residents as of the U.S. 2020 census. Of the Valley's three major cities, Allentown, Bethlehem, and Easton, Easton is the smallest with approximately one-fourth the population of Allentown, the Valley's largest city.

The greater Easton area includes the city of Easton, three townships (Forks, Palmer, and Williams), and three boroughs (Glendon, West Easton, and Wilson). Centre Square, the city's town square in its downtown neighborhood, is home to the Soldiers' and Sailors' Monument, a memorial for Easton area veterans killed during the American Civil War. In the first half of the 20th century, Centre Square was referred to locally as the Circle. The Peace Candle, a candle-like structure, is assembled and disassembled every year atop the Civil War monument for the Christmas season.

Norfolk Southern Railway's Lehigh Line, formerly the main line of the Lehigh Valley Railroad, runs through Easton on its way to Bethlehem and Allentown heading west across the Delaware River to Phillipsburg, New Jersey.

Etymology

On August 22, 1751, Thomas Penn, the son of William Penn, the colony's founder and original proprietor married Juliana Fermor. On September 8, 1751, a letter was sent to Colonial Governor James Hamilton by Penn requesting that a new town on the confluence of the Lehigh and Delaware Rivers be named Easton and that it be in a new county called Northampton. In 1752, as requested, the city was named in honor of Lady Juliana's family estate, the Easton Neston. The county was named after the estate's location, which was in the south of Northamptonshire, England.

History

18th century

The Lenape Native Americans originally referred to the area as Lechauwitank, or "The Place at the Forks". The land for the future city was obtained from the Lenape in the Walking Purchase of 1737. A plaque commemorating the transaction appears in Easton's town square. Thomas Penn set aside a  tract of land at the confluence of the Lehigh and Delaware rivers for a town. Easton was settled by Europeans in 1739 and founded in 1752, As Northampton County was being formed, Easton was selected as its county seat.

During the French and Indian War, the Treaty of Easton was signed in Easton by the British colonial government of the Province of Pennsylvania and the Native American tribes in the Ohio Country, including the Shawnee and Lenape.

Easton was an important military center during the American Revolutionary War. During the Revolutionary War, Easton had a military hospital. On June 18, 1779, General John Sullivan led 2,500 Continental Army soldiers from Easton to engage British Indian allies on the frontier. Easton was one of the first three places the Declaration of Independence was publicly read, along with Philadelphia and Trenton. The Easton flag was flown during the Declaration's reading, making it one of the first Stars and Stripes to fly over the colonies. This flag was later used by a militia during the War of 1812 and currently serves as Easton's municipal flag.

19th century
Located at the confluence of the rapidly flowing Lehigh River and the deeper and wider Delaware River, Easton became a major commercial center during the canal and railroad periods of the 19th century and a transportation hub for the region's coal, iron, and steel industries. The Delaware Canal was built soon after the lower Lehigh Canal was opened in 1818 and became effective in delivering much-needed anthracite coal to the region's largest markets, Philadelphia, New Jersey, and New York City. 

Seeing other ways of exploiting the new fuel source, other entrepreneurs quickly moved to connect across the Delaware River reaching into the New York City area to the east through the Morris Canal in Phillipsburg, New Jersey, so the town became a canal hub from which coal from Mauch Chunk reached the world. Early railroads were often built to parallel this transportation corridor. By the late 1860s, the Lehigh and Susquehanna Railroad (LH&S) and Lehigh Valley Railroad (LVRR) were built to augment the bulk traffic through the canals and provide lucrative passenger travel services. The LVRR, known as the Black Diamond Line operated twice daily express passenger trains to and from New York City and Buffalo, New York via Easton. The Central Railroad of New Jersey (CNJ), leased and operated the LH&S tracks from the 1870s until the Conrail consolidations absorbed both the Central Railroad of New Jersey and Lehigh Valley Railroad in 1966. Today, the Lehigh Valley Railroad's main line is the only major rail line that goes through Easton and is now known as the Lehigh Line; the Lehigh Line was bought by the Norfolk Southern Railway in 1999.

In the mid-19th century, canal transportation was largely replaced by railroads, and Easton became a hub for five railroads, including the Jersey Central, Lehigh Valley Railroad, and others. Easton lost its prominence in passenger transportation with the rise of the automobile in the mid-20th century.

20th and 21st centuries
Like the Pennsylvania Dutch region to the southwest, Easton was settled largely by Germans. The Pennsylvania Argus, a German language newspaper, was published in Easton until 1917. As part of their heritage, the Germans put up one of the continent's earliest Christmas trees in Easton; Daniel Foley's book states that, "Another diary reference unearthed recently makes mention of a tree set-up at Easton, Pennsylvania, in 1816." There is a plaque in Scott Park along the Delaware River that commemorates this event. The Pennsylvania guide, compiled by the Writers' Program of the Works Progress Administration in 1940, described the rich and cosmopolitan fabric of Easton's society in the first half of the 20th century:

Historians of angling believe that Samuel Phillipe, an Easton gunsmith, invented the six-strip split-cane bamboo fly rod, commemorating by a Pennsylvania Historical and Museum Commission plaque near Easton's Center Square.

Geography

 
Easton is located at  (40.688248, −75.216458).
It also includes an island, Getter's Island, which was the site of Pennsylvania's last public execution.

Districts
Easton is divided into four districts: Downtown (DD), College Hill (CH), South Side (SS), and West Ward (WW). A number of smaller additional parks and institutional districts also exist.

Downtown Easton lies at the confluence of the Lehigh River and Delaware River and is a low-lying area surrounded by hills to the north, west, and south. North of downtown is College Hill, home of Lafayette College. South Easton, divided by the Lehigh River from the rest of the city, was a separate borough until 1898; it was settled initially by Native Americans and later by canal workers, and home to several silk mills. Wilson, West Easton, and Glendon are directly adjacent to the city. Wilson partly aligns to the same north-south grid as Easton.

Downtown Historic District
Easton's Historic Downtown District lies directly at the confluence of the north banks of the Lehigh River and west banks of the Delaware River. Downtown adjoins each of the three other districts to the north, west, and south. Downtown continues west to Sixth Street and north to US Route 22.

College Hill
College Hill is located north of downtown, starting north of US Route 22. This neighborhood is home of Lafayette College, a liberal arts and engineering institution.

South Side
The South Side district lies south of the Lehigh River.

West Ward
The West Ward district is located west of downtown and encompasses much of west side Easton between Sixth and Fifteenth Streets.

Climate
Under the Köppen climate classification, Easton falls within either a hot-summer humid continental climate (Dfa) if the  isotherm is used or a humid subtropical climate (Cfa) if the  isotherm is used.  Summers are usually hot and very muggy, averaging in the mid-80s during the day, though the high humidity makes it feel much warmer.  Fall and spring months are typically mild, offering many days in the mid-60s, as well as stronger winds. Winters are usually very cold and produce about 30 inches of snow. The local hardiness zone is 6b.

Government
Easton operates a mayor-on-council city government. Residents elect a city controller, six city councilpersons (three at large and three district), and a mayor who is chairman and a voting member of the city council. All these officials are elected to four-year terms. The incumbent mayor, Democrat Salvatore J. Panto, Jr., was reelected to his fourth consecutive term in 2019; he previously served two terms as Easton mayor from 1984–1992.

Easton is part of Pennsylvania's 7th congressional district, represented in the U.S. House of Representatives currently by Democrat Susan Wild, who was first elected to the office in 2018.

Demographics

As of the 2010 census, the city was 67.2% White, 16.8% Black or African American, 0.4% Native American, 2.4% Asian, 0.1% Native Hawaiian, and 4.9% were two or more races. 19.9% of the population were of Hispanic or Latino ancestry. As of the 2000 census, there were 26,263 people, 9,544 households, and 5,735 families residing in the city. The population density was 6,168.4 per square mile (2,380.3/km2). There were 10,545 housing units at an average density of 2,476.7 per square mile (955.7/km2). The racial makeup of the city was 78.48% White, 12.71% African American, 0.24% Native American, 1.66% Asian, 0.11% Pacific Islander, 3.67% from other races, and 3.13% from two or more races. Hispanic or Latino of any race were 9.79% of the population. The increase in Hispanic/Latinos—from less than 10% of the population in the 2000 census, to nearly 20% in the 2010 census, is a significant change in the city's demographics. The growth in Hispanic residents is similar to increases in Allentown and Bethlehem, the Valley's two largest cities.

There were 9,544 households, out of which 30.5% had children under the age of 18 living with them, 37.7% were married couples living together, 16.6% had a female householder with no husband present, and 39.9% were non-families. 31.5% of all households were made up of individuals, and 11.0% had someone living alone who was 65 years of age or older. The average household size was 2.46 and the average family size was 3.10.

In the city, the population was spread out, with 23.3% under the age of 18, 16.3% from 18 to 24, 29.9% from 25 to 44, 18.6% from 45 to 64, and 11.9% who were 65 years of age or older. The median age was 32 years. For every 100 females, there were 97.4 males. For every 100 females age 18 and over, there were 96.1 males. The median income for a household in the city was $33,162, and the median income for a family was $38,704. Males had a median income of $32,356 versus $23,609 for females. The per capita income for the city was $15,949. About 12.3% of families and 16.0% of the population were below the poverty line, including 21.3% of those under age 18 and 11.2% of those age 65 or over.

Education

Public education

The Easton Area School District serves the residents of the city of Easton along with Forks and Palmer Townships and the village of Martins Creek to the north. As of the 2000 census, the combined population of the municipalities in the Easton Area School District was 53,554.

The school district has seven elementary schools: Cheston, Forks, March, Palmer, Paxinosa, Shawnee, and Tracy for grades K-5, Easton Area Middle School Campus (in Forks Township) for grades 6–8, and Easton Area High School (in Easton) for grades 9–12. Total student enrollment in the school district is approximately 8,289 students in all grades as of 2020-21.

Easton Area High School is known for its long-standing athletic rivalry with Phillipsburg High School in neighboring Phillipsburg, New Jersey. The two teams play an annual football game on Thanksgiving Day that is considered one of the largest and longest-standing rivalries in American high school football. In 2006, the rivalry marked its 100th anniversary. The game, which was broadcast on ESPN, was won by Easton. In 2009, Easton was the location of the Gatorade REPLAY Game in which the 1993 teams from the Easton vs. Phillipsburg game met again following their 7–7 tie in 1993. The REPLAY Game was won by Phillipsburg, 27–12.

Easton Area High School competes in the Eastern Pennsylvania Conference, which includes the 12 largest high schools in the Lehigh Valley and Poconos and is one of the nation's most elite high school athletic conferences. Easton holds the third most conference championships in all sports, behind only Parkland High School and Emmaus High School. Easton is also home to Notre Dame High School, a Catholic school.

Post-secondary education
Easton is the home of one four-year college, Lafayette College, which was established in 1826. Lafayette is located in Easton's College Hill section and is home to 2,514 undergraduate students as of the 2022-2023 academic year. In 2017, U.S. News & World Report ranked Lafayette as the nation's 36th best liberal arts college.

Before the American Civil War, Easton was home to Union Law School, which was founded in 1846 but struggled soon after the 1856 death of its founder, Judge Washington McCartney. While at least one student, future Wisconsin state senator Robert L. D. Potter, graduated in the spring of 1857, a historian in 2000 dismissed Union in an endnote as "a one-man operation that died with him" [i.e., McCartney].

Industry

Easton is the home of 27 interactive children's attractions, and the National Canal Museum, which focuses on the region's canal history, and the Crayola Experience, which is owned by Crayola LLC, formerly known as Binney & Smith, a major toy manufacturer based in nearby Forks Township. The global headquarters for Victaulic is based in nearby Forks Township. Easton also was once the home of Dixie Cup Corporation, manufacturer of Dixie Cups and other consumer products. Majestic Athletic, current provider of Major League Baseball uniforms, is based in nearby Palmer Township.

The Lehigh Valley Railroad, Central Railroad of New Jersey (using the Lehigh and Susquehanna Railroad), Lehigh and Hudson River Railway, and Conrail are major defunct railroads that operated in Easton. Norfolk Southern Railway is now the only railroad in Easton.

Media

Easton's daily newspaper is The Express-Times. The Morning Call, based in Allentown, also is read in the city. Easton is part of the Philadelphia media market but also receives numerous radio and television channels from New York City and the smaller Scranton-Wilkes-Barre media market to the northwest.

Two television stations are based in the Easton area: PBS affiliate WLVT Channel 39 in Bethlehem and independent station WFMZ Channel 69 in Allentown.

Five radio stations are based in Easton: WEEX, a sports radio station broadcasting at 1230 AM, WODE-FM "The Hawk", a classic rock station broadcasting at 99.9 FM, WCTO "Cat Country 96," a country music station broadcasting on 96.1 FM, WJRH, a Lafayette College college radio station broadcasting at 104.9 FM, and WEST "Loud Radio", a rhythmic contemporary radio station broadcasting at 99.5 FM. WDIY-FM, a National Public Radio affiliate located in Bethlehem, maintains a translator in Easton and broadcasts at 93.9 FM.

Two national magazines, Runner's World and Bicycling, are based in Easton.

Telecommunications
Easton was once served only by the 215 area code from 1947 when the North American Numbering Plan of the Bell System went into effect until 1994. In response to southeastern Pennsylvania's growing telecommunication demand, Easton telephone exchanges were switched to area code 610 in 1994. An overlay area code, 484, was added to the 610 service area in 1999.

Infrastructure

Transportation

Interstate 78 is the most prominent highway passing through Easton. It briefly passes through the southeastern corner of the city on an east-west alignment, but the nearest interchange is in adjacent Williams Township. U.S. Route 22 is the main highway through central Easton, following the Lehigh Valley Thruway along an east-west alignment. Pennsylvania Route 33 briefly crosses the far southwestern corner of Easton, but the nearest interchange is in Bethlehem Township. Pennsylvania Route 611 follows a north-south route along the east side of the city adjacent to the Delaware River. Finally, Pennsylvania Route 248 begins at the junction of PA 611 and US 22 and heads westward along surface streets.

Major east−west roads (from north to south) in Easton include Corriere Road, Zucksville Road, Northwood Avenue, Lafayette Street, Hackett Avenue, Northampton Street, Butler Street (known as William Penn Highway west of Wilson, then as Easton Avenue nearing Bethlehem), Freemansburg Avenue, and Canal Street. Major north−south roads (from west to east) in Easton include Farmersville Road, Stones Crossing Road, Greenwood Avenue, 25th Street, Bushkill Drive, 13th Street, Centre Street, Sullivan Trail, Richmond Road, 3rd Street (Known as Smith Avenue south of the Lehigh River, then as Philadelphia Road farther south), Cattell Street, Riverside Drive, and Delaware Drive (PA 611).

Braden Airpark, also known as Easton Airport, is a smaller airport located about three nautical miles north of Easton's central business district.

Local bus transportation is provided by LANta, which serves Lehigh and Northampton counties. The Easton Intermodal Transportation Center in downtown Easton serves as a hub for LANTA buses. NJ Transit provides bus service from Center Square in Easton to Phillipsburg and Pohatcong in New Jersey along the 890 and 891 routes. Greyhound Lines provides intercity bus service to Easton, stopping at the Easton Intermodal Transportation Center. Trans-Bridge Lines provides regular bus service to New York City.

Easton has no passenger rail service. Until 1983 NJ Transit's Raritan Valley Line terminated at Phillipsburg, across the Delaware River from Easton. Under NJT's I-78 Corridor study, this service would be restored. The former Lehigh Valley Railroad main line, the Lehigh Line, travels through Easton and is owned by the Norfolk Southern Railway.

Utilities
Electricity in Easton is provided by Akron, Ohio-based FirstEnergy. Natural gas service in Easton is provided by King of Prussia, Pennsylvania-based UGI Corporation. The city's Public Works department provides water, sewer service, and trash and recycling collection to Easton. Easton's water supply comes from the Delaware River. The city's water is treated at a filtration plant along the Delaware River and then stored in reservoirs and delivered to customers. Easton Suburban Water Authority serves suburban areas outside of Easton and purchases water from the city's Public Works Department. The city's Public Works department contracts with Raritan Valley Disposal for trash and recycling collection in Easton.

Notable people

Elbern Alkire, inventor of a 10-string steel guitar called the Eharp
Chuck Amato, former head football coach, North Carolina State
Lisa Ann, adult film actress
Christian Bauman, novelist
James McKeen Cattell, first United States psychology professor
Thomas Coates, conductor of Pomp's Cornet Band and the "Father of Band Music in America"
Jack Coleman, television actor
Joseph Force Crater, subject of infamous missing person case
George Daniel, commissioner, National Lacrosse League
Keno Davis, head basketball coach, Flint United
Parke H. Davis, former head college football coach
Don Dixon, astronomical artist
Omar Doom, actor and musician
Michael Flynn, science fiction writer
Larry Holmes, former heavyweight boxing champion of the world (fought under nickname "The Easton Assassin")
Frank Reed Horton, founder of Alpha Phi Omega service fraternity
Greg Howe, guitar virtuoso 
Chauncey Howell, former newscaster and journalist
Daniel Dae Kim, actor, ABC's Lost and CBS's Hawaii Five-0
Christopher Lennertz, music composer, Alvin and the Chipmunks and Supernatural
Samuel D. Gross, academic trauma surgeon
Carolyn Price Horton, bookbinder and conservator
Francis March, academic, founder of comparative linguistics
Peyton C. March, former U.S. Army Chief of Staff
Kristen McMenamy, fashion model
Robert B. Meyner, former New Jersey governor
Mulgrew Miller, jazz pianist
Randall Munroe, writer, xkcd comic series
Henry Harrison Oberly, Episcopal priest and writer
Alix Ohlin, novelist
Jordan Oliver, collegiate and freestyle wrestler, two-time NCAA national champion at Oklahoma State
Chanelle Price, gold medalist, track and field in 800 metres, 2014 IAAF World Indoor Championships
Frank Pulli, former Major League Baseball umpire
Sally Jessy Raphael, former television talk show host
Andrew Horatio Reeder, former Kansas governor
Henry Melchior Muhlenberg Richards, American military officer
William Findlay Rogers, former mayor of Buffalo, New York
Dee Roscioli, Broadway actress, Elphaba in Wicked
Alfred A. Schlert, Roman Catholic bishop
Florence B. Seibert, former biochemist, winner of the Garvan–Olin Medal
Charles Sitgreaves, former U.S. Congressman
Samuel Sitgreaves, former U.S. Congressman and U.S. commissioner to Great Britain
Jennie Somogyi, former principal ballet dancer, New York City Ballet
Peter Stevenson, former Gaelic football player
George Taylor, founding father who signed the Declaration of Independence
Jim Trimble, former professional football coach, inventor of standard slingshot goalposts
Dave Van Horne, former professional baseball broadcaster, Montreal Expos and Florida Marlins
Jack Wallaesa, former professional player, Chicago White Sox and Philadelphia Athletics 
Samuel Wallin, former U.S. Congressman
Bobby Weaver, gold medalist at 1984 Summer Olympics in freestyle wrestling
Bob Weiss, professional NBA player and coach
Charles A. Wikoff, most senior-ranking U.S. Army officer killed in Spanish–American War
Roger Ross Williams, film director, producer and writer, first African American director to win an Oscar

Events
Baconfest, held first weekend in November
Easton Garlic Festival, held first weekend in October
Heritage Day, held in July
Riverside Festival of the Arts, held in September

See also 
 Lenape Nation of Pennsylvania, an unrecognized cultural heritage group based in Easton

References

External links

Easton news at The Morning Call
"Famous People from the Lehigh Valley," The Morning Call, August 18, 2008

 
1739 establishments in Pennsylvania
Cities in Northampton County, Pennsylvania
Cities in Pennsylvania
County seats in Pennsylvania
Pennsylvania populated places on the Delaware River
Populated places established in 1739
Populated places on the Lehigh River